This is a list of awards and nominations received by American director and screenwriter Damien Chazelle.

Chazelle made his directorial debut with the musical Guy and Madeline on a Park Bench (2009). He wrote and directed his second feature film, Whiplash (2014), based on his award-winning 2013 short film of the same name. The film premiered at the 2014 Sundance Film Festival as the opening film where it won the U.S. Grand Jury Prize: Dramatic and Audience Award: U.S. Dramatic and went on to receive five Academy Award nominations, including Best Picture, winning three with Chazelle himself nominated for Best Adapted Screenplay.

He is also known for co-writing 10 Cloverfield Lane, and writing and directing La La Land, both released in 2016. For La La Land, he was nominated for several awards including two Academy Awards for Best Original Screenplay and Best Director, Directors Guild of America Award for Best Director, Writers Guild of America Award for Best Original Screenplay, two BAFTA Awards for Best Original Screenplay and Best Director and won two Critics' Choice Movie Award for Best Screenplay and Best Director and also two Golden Globe Award for Best Screenplay and Best Director, with the film itself receiving a record-breaking seven Golden Globes at the 74th Golden Globe Awards.

At 32, Chazelle is the youngest person to win the Academy Award and Golden Globe Award for Best Director.

Major associations

Academy Awards

British Academy of Film and Television Arts Awards

Directors Guild of America Award

Golden Globe Awards

Other awards and nominations

AACTA International Awards

Alliance of Women Film Journalists

Aspen Shortsfest

Austin Film Critics Association

Boston Society of Film Critics

Bram Stoker Awards

Calgary International Film Festival

Camerimage Awards

Cannes Film Festival

Chicago Film Critics Association

Critics' Choice Movie Awards

Denver Film Critics Society

Denver International Film Festival

Detroit Film Critics Society

Florida Film Critics Circle

Gaudí Awards

Gotham Awards

Hamptons International Film Festival

Houston Film Critics Society

Independent Spirit Awards

London Film Critics' Circle

Los Angeles Film Critics Association

Mill Valley Film Festival

MTV Movie Awards

National Society of Film Critics

Online Film Critics Society

San Diego Film Critics Society

San Francisco Film Critics Circle

Satellite Awards

Saturn Award

St. Louis Gateway Film Critics Association

Sundance Film Festival

Tallinn Black Nights Film Festival

Torino Film Festival

Toronto Film Critics Association

Toronto International Film Festival

Valladolid International Film Festival

Vancouver Film Critics Circle

Venice Film Festival

Washington D.C. Area Film Critics Association

Writers Guild of America Award

External links

References

Chazelle, Damien